Reginald Brooks may refer to:

 Dallas Brooks (Reginald Alexander Dallas Brooks, 1896–1966), British military commander, cricketer and Governor of Victoria, Australia
 Reginald Shirley Brooks (1854–1888), English journalist